Keith Williams (born 12 April 1957, in Dudley, England) is a footballer who played as midfielder for Aston Villa, Northampton Town and Bournemouth.

References

1957 births
Living people
English footballers
Association football midfielders
Aston Villa F.C. players
Northampton Town F.C. players
AFC Bournemouth players
Colchester United F.C. players
Sportspeople from Dudley
English Football League players